Bedřich or Bedrich may refer to:

Bedrich Benes (born 1967), computer scientist and a researcher in Computer Graphics
Bedřich Bloudek, Czech military leader who participated in the Slovak Uprising in 1848
Bedřich Bridel (1619–1680), Czech baroque writer, poet, and missionary
Bedřich Brunclík (born 1946), former Czech ice hockey player
Bedřich Dvořák (1930–2018), Czechoslovak sprint canoeist
Bedřich Feigl (1884–1965), Czech-Jewish painter, graphic designer and illustrator
Bedřich Feuerstein (1892–1936), Czech architect, painter and essayist
Bedrich Formánek (born 1933), Slovak chess composer
Bedřich Fritta (1906–1944), Czech-Jewish artist and cartoonist
Bedřich Geminder (1901–1952), Chief of the International Section of the Secretariat of Czechoslovak Communist Party
Bedřich Golombek (1901–1961), Czech journalist and writer
Bedřich Hamsa (born 1965), Czech former football player
Bedřich Havránek (1821–1899), Czech painter, illustrator and art teacher
Bedřich Hošek (born 1911), Czech middle-distance runner
Bedřich Hrozný (1879–1952), Czech orientalist and linguist
Jan Bedrich Kittl (born 1806), Czech composer
Bedřich Köhler (born 1985), Czech professional ice hockey player
Bedrich Loewy, birth name of Fritz Löhner-Beda (1883–1942), Austrian librettist, lyricist and writer
Bedřich Moldan (born 1935), Czech ecologist, publicist and politician
Bedřich Nikodém (1909–1970), male Czech international table tennis player, composer, lyricist and musician
August Bedřich Piepenhagen (1791–1868), German landscape painter who spent most of his career in Prague
Bedřich Pokorný (1904–1968), Czechoslovak secret service officer
Bedřich Pola (born 1963), Czech entrepreneur
Bedrich Posselt, Czechoslovakian bobsledder who competed in the mid-1930s
Bedřich Procházka (1855–1934), Czechoslovak mathematician
Bedřich Procházka (rowing) (born 1909), Czech rower
Bedřich Reicin (1911–1952), Czechoslovak army officer and politician
Bedřich Ščerban (born 1964), Czech former professional ice hockey defenceman
Bedřich Schejbal (born 1874), Bohemian fencer
Bedřich Smetana (1824–1884), Czech composer
Bedřich Šupčík (1898–1957), former Czechoslovak gymnast and Olympic champion
Bedřich Tylšar (born 1939), Czech horn player and music pedagogue
Bedřich Vygoda (born 1894), Czech sprinter
Bedřich Wachsmann (1820–1897), German-speaking Czech painter, decorator and architect
Bedřich Diviš Weber (1766–1842), Bohemian composer and musicologist, the first Director of the Prague Conservatory
Bedrich Weiss (1919–1944), jazz musician and arranger
Bedřich Antonín Wiedermann (1883–1951), Czech organist, composer, and teacher

See also
Bedrich or Frederick, Duke of Bohemia (1142–1189), a member of the Přemyslid dynasty
Bedřich Smetana Museum in Prague, dedicated to the life and works of famous Czech composer Bedřich Smetana (1824–1884)
Bedřichov (disambiguation)
Berich
Edrich

Czech masculine given names